Seri Setia Bridge is a main bridge in Putrajaya, Malaysia.

The Seri Setia Bridge is located in the southeastern corner of Putrajaya, providing a vital link between Precinct 19 and the Commercial Precinct and the main route to the core island from the southeast. Made up of eight equal spans of 30 metres each, the bridge has lancet-arch designs on its railing that complement the fascia panels on its side.

Among the features of this bridge are precast fascia panels, planter boxes on the medians, railings with architectural features and illuminations with decorative lightings.

See also
 Transport in Malaysia

References

Bridges in Putrajaya